Guangzhou International Light Festival (or GZ Light) is a light exhibiting festival held annually along the Pearl River in the city of Guangzhou, China. The festival occurs every November since 2010, when the 16th Asian Games left many lighting facilities on the ground of the event.

External links 
Official website

References 

Festivals in China
Autumn events in China
Light festivals